Anthrenus is a genus of beetles in the family Dermestidae, the skin beetles. One of several genera of carpet beetles, Anthrenus was historically placed in a subfamily Anthreninae, though presently included in the Megatominae. The genus Neoanthrenus is closely related.

Anthrenus carpet beetles are small beetles a few millimetres long with a rather rounded shape. Their antennae bear small clubs at the end, which are plumper in males than in females. Many have a delicate and rather pretty pattern, with a dark body covered in colorful scales of various brown, tan, red, whitish and grey hues. These scales rub off easily, and old individuals are often partially devoid of them, showing the shining black elytra. A considerable  number of subspecies and varieties have been named, but it is questionable whether these are all valid or simply refer to such age-related differences. The massive number of species has been divided into several subgenera, but these are not too firmly established. The small subgenus Helocerus for example is sometimes entirely included in Florilinus. Also, new species are being described every now and then.

These beetles range essentially all over the world; they have even colonized some remote oceanic islands. Most species are harmless pollen-eaters, with the long-haired larvae feeding on a wide range on dead animal or plant matter. This makes them important decomposers, which clean up decaying organisms. Some, however, most notoriously the museum beetle (A. museorum), are significant pests, infesting stored goods and especially biological specimens in museum collections. These species have caused considerable damage to biology by destroying valuable type specimens. Their larvae may cause considerable damage on wool, fur, feathers, and natural history collections.

Species
Anthrenus contains the following species:

Anthrenus aegyptiacus Pic, 1899
Anthrenus afer Péringuey, 1886
Anthrenus alatauensis Mroczkowski, 1962
Anthrenus albomaculatus Pic, 1927
Anthrenus albonotatus Pic, 1922
Anthrenus albostictus Reitter, 1881
Anthrenus almatyensis Háva, 2018
Anthrenus amandae Holloway, 2019
†Anthrenus ambericus Háva, Prokop & Herrmann, 2006
Anthrenus amoenulus Reitter, 1896
Anthrenus angustefasciatus Ganglbauer, 1904
Anthrenus aradensis Mawlood & Abdul-Rassoul, 2003
Anthrenus araxensis Zhantiev, 1976
Anthrenus ardoi Kadej & Háva, 2011
Anthrenus armstrongielus Kadej & Háva, 2013
Anthrenus arndti Háva, 2005
Anthrenus assimilis Zhantiev, 1976
Anthrenus aterrimus (Gerstäcker, 1871)
Anthrenus auratus Zhantiev, 1979
Anthrenus bactrianus Zhantiev, 2004
Anthrenus bajtenovi Sokolov, 1974
Anthrenus barclayi Háva, 2019
Anthrenus bartolozzii Háva, 2003
Anthrenus basilewskyi Kalík, 1965
Anthrenus beali Zhantiev, 2004
Anthrenus becvari Háva, 2004
Anthrenus bellulus Chobaut, 1897
Anthrenus bezdeki Háva, 2017
Anthrenus bilyi Háva, 2000
Anthrenus biskrensis Reitter, 1887
Anthrenus blanci Beal, 1998
Anthrenus bobo Háva, 2003
Anthrenus bomiensis Háva, 2004
Anthrenus botswaniensis Háva & Kadej, 2006
Anthrenus boyesi Háva, 2004
Anthrenus bucharicus Zhantiev, 1976
Anthrenus buettikeri Mroczkowski, 1980
Anthrenus bulirschi Háva, 2000
Anthrenus capensis Guérin-Méneville, 1835
Anthrenus cardamom Háva, 2001
Anthrenus castaneae Melsheimer, 1844
Anthrenus caucasicus Reitter, 1881
Anthrenus cechovskyi Háva & Kadej, 2015
Anthrenus cervenkai Háva & Herrmann, 2006
Anthrenus ceylonicus Kadej & Háva, 2006
Anthrenus chiton Beal, 1998
Anthrenus cimrmani Háva, 2005
Anthrenus coacheorum Háva, 2022
Anthrenus coloratus Reitter, 1881
Anthrenus consobrinus (Háva, 2005)
Anthrenus constantini Háva & Herrmann, 2006
Anthrenus cordis Háva & Kadej, 2006
Anthrenus coreanus Mroczkowski, 1966
Anthrenus cornelli Háva & Herrmann, 2008
Anthrenus corona Holloway, 2021
Anthrenus crustaceus Reitter, 1881
Anthrenus cylindricornis Herrmann & Háva, 2014
Anthrenus danielssoni Háva, 2007
Anthrenus darjeelingi Háva, 2020
Anthrenus debilis Háva, 2005
Anthrenus delicatus Kiesenwetter, 1851
Anthrenus difficilis Háva, 2005
Anthrenus distinctus Kadej & Háva, 2006
Anthrenus dsungaricus Mroczkowski, 1962
Anthrenus edopetri Háva, 2004
Anthrenus eichleri Kadej & Háva, 2006
†Anthrenus electron Háva, Prokop & Kadej, 2006
Anthrenus emili Herrmann & Háva, 2019
Anthrenus endroedyi Háva, 2003
Anthrenus ethiopicus Háva, 2004
Anthrenus exilis Mulsant & Rey, 1868
Anthrenus farsicus Kadej & Háva, 2011
Anthrenus fernandezi Háva, 2003
Anthrenus festivus Erichson, 1846
Anthrenus flavidulus Reitter, 1889
Anthrenus flavidus Solsky, 1876
Anthrenus flavipes LeConte, 1854
Anthrenus frater Arrow, 1915
Anthrenus fucosus Beal, 1998
Anthrenus fugong Háva, 2019
Anthrenus funebris Reitter, 1889
Anthrenus fuscus Olivier, 1789
Anthrenus geisthardti Háva & Herrmann, 2006
Anthrenus gobicus Zhantiev, 2004
Anthrenus goliath Saulcy, 1868
Anthrenus gorki Háva, 2008
Anthrenus gracilis Zhantiev, 2004
†Anthrenus groehni Háva, Prokop & Herrmann, 2006
Anthrenus guineaensis Háva, 2004
Anthrenus hartmanni Háva, 2000
Anthrenus havai Kadej & Jakubska, 2007
Anthrenus heptamerus Peyerimhoff, 1924
Anthrenus herrmanni Kadej & Háva, 2016
Anthrenus himalayensis Háva, Wachkoo & Maqbool, 2019
Anthrenus hissaricus Mroczkowski, 1961
Anthrenus hoberlandti Kadej, Háva & Kalík, 2007
Anthrenus hrdlickai Háva, 2016
Anthrenus hulai Háva, 2017
Anthrenus indicus Kadej, Háva & Kalík, 2007
Anthrenus ineptus Háva & Tezcan, 2004
Anthrenus isabellinus Küster, 1848
Anthrenus israelicus Háva, 2004
Anthrenus jacobsoni Zhantiev, 1976
Anthrenus jakli Háva, 2001
Anthrenus japonicus Ohbayashi, 1985
Anthrenus jelineki Háva, 2009
Anthrenus jordanicus Pic, 1934
Anthrenus kabakovi Kadej & Háva, 2016
Anthrenus kabateki Háva, 2014
Anthrenus kadeji Herrmann & Háva, 2009
Anthrenus kafkai Kadej & Háva, 2011
Anthrenus kaliki Pic, 1952
Anthrenus kalimantanus Háva, 2004
Anthrenus kantneri Háva, 2003
Anthrenus kaszabi Zhantiev, 1973
Anthrenus katerinae Háva & Kadej, 2006
Anthrenus katmandui Kadej, Háva & Kitano, 2016
Anthrenus katrinkrauseae Háva, 2018
Anthrenus kejvali Háva, 2000
Anthrenus kenyaensis Háva, 2004
†Anthrenus kerneggeri Háva, Prokop & Herrmann, 2008
Anthrenus king (Háva, 2002)
Anthrenus klapperichi Kadej & Háva, 2006
Anthrenus klichai Herrmann, Kadej & Háva, 2016
Anthrenus knizeki Háva, 2004
Anthrenus kompantzevi Zhantiev, 2004
Anthrenus kopeckyi Háva, 2017
Anthrenus kourili Háva, 2006
Anthrenus kryzhanovskii Sokolov, 1979
Anthrenus kubistai Háva & Votruba, 2005
Anthrenus kucerai Háva, 2005
†Anthrenus larvalis Cockerell, 1917
Anthrenus latefasciatus Reitter, 1892
Anthrenus lepidus LeConte, 1854
Anthrenus leucogrammus Solsky, 1876
Anthrenus liliputianus Mulsant & Rey, 1868
Anthrenus lilligi Háva & Herrmann, 2008
Anthrenus lindbergi Mroczkowski, 1959
Anthrenus linnavuorii Háva, 2014
Anthrenus loebli Kadej & Háva, 2010
Anthrenus longisetosus Kadej & Háva, 2015
Anthrenus longus Arrow, 1915
Anthrenus lopatini Zhantiev, 1976
Anthrenus luteovestitus (Pic, 1937)
Anthrenus macqueeni (Armstrong, 1949)
Anthrenus maculatus Fabricius, 1798
Anthrenus maculifer Reitter, 1881
Anthrenus maharashtranus Háva, 2002
Anthrenus malawicus Háva, 2004
Anthrenus malkini Mroczkowski, 1980
Anthrenus maltzi Kadej, 2010
Anthrenus margarethae Háva & Kadej, 2006
Anthrenus medvedevi Zhantiev, 2006
Anthrenus megalops Arrow, 1915
Anthrenus mendax Háva, 2006
Anthrenus merkli Háva, 2003
Anthrenus mesopotamicus Háva, 2001
Anthrenus milkoi Zhantiev, 2004
Anthrenus mindanaoensis Háva, 2004
Anthrenus miniatulus Reitter, 1899
Anthrenus miniopictus Bedel, 1884
Anthrenus minor Wollaston, 1865
Anthrenus minutus Erichson, 1846
Anthrenus molitor Aubé, 1850
Anthrenus mongolicus Zhantiev, 1973
Anthrenus moroccanus Háva, 2015
Anthrenus mroczkowskii Kalík, 1954
Anthrenus mugodsharicus Sokolov, 1974
Anthrenus munroi Hinton, 1943
Anthrenus museorum (Linnaeus, 1761)
Anthrenus nadeini Kadej & Háva, 2008
Anthrenus nahiricus Zhantiev, 1976
Anthrenus namibicus Háva, 2000
Anthrenus narani Háva & Ahmed, 2014
Anthrenus natalensis Háva, 2004
Anthrenus nepalensis Kadej & Háva, 2012
Anthrenus nideki Háva, 2005
Anthrenus nipponensis Kalík & Ohbayashi, 1985
Anthrenus niveosparsus (Armstrong, 1941)
Anthrenus nocivus Mulsant & Godart, 1870
Anthrenus noctua Háva, 2005
Anthrenus obenbergeri Háva & Herrmann, 2021
Anthrenus oberthueri Reitter, 1881
Anthrenus obscurus Thunberg, 1815
Anthrenus occultus Háva, 2006
Anthrenus oceanicus Fauvel, 1903
Anthrenus ocellifer Blackburn, 1891
Anthrenus oculatus Arrow, 1937
Anthrenus ohbayashii Kadej, Háva & Kitano, 2016
Anthrenus olgae Kalík, 1946
Anthrenus omoi Beal, 1998
Anthrenus orientalis Motschulsky, 1851
Anthrenus pacificus Fairmaire, 1850
Anthrenus palaeoaegyptiacus Grüss, 1930
Anthrenus pallidus Sokolov, 1974
Anthrenus paraclaviger Háva & Kadej, 2008
Anthrenus parallelus (Armstrong, 1941)
Anthrenus paramolitor Herrmann & Háva, 2021
Anthrenus parthicus Zhantiev, 1976
Anthrenus paulyi Háva, 2003
Anthrenus perak Háva, 2016
Anthrenus pfefferi Kalík, 1954
Anthrenus picturatus Solsky, 1876
Anthrenus pilosus Pic, 1923
Anthrenus pimpinellae (Fabricius, 1775)
Anthrenus poggii Háva, 2002
Anthrenus polonicus Mroczkowski, 1951
Anthrenus preissi Háva & Herrmann, 2003
Anthrenus propinquus Háva, 2005
Anthrenus prudeki Háva, 2002
Anthrenus pubifer Reitter, 1899
Anthrenus pueblanus Háva, 2021
Anthrenus pulaskii Kadej, 2011
Anthrenus pulchellus Gestro, 1889
Anthrenus purcharti Háva, 2014
Anthrenus pushkini Herrmann, Kadej & Háva, 2016
Anthrenus qinlingensis Háva, 2004
Anthrenus rauterbergi Reitter, 1908
Anthrenus rotundulus Reitter, 1889
Anthrenus sabahense Háva, 2021
Anthrenus safad Háva, 2013
Anthrenus sarnicus Mroczkowski, 1963
Anthrenus schawalleri Háva & Kadej, 2006
Anthrenus scrophulariae (Linnaeus, 1758)
Anthrenus seideli Háva, 2021
Anthrenus semenovi Zhantiev, 1976
Anthrenus seminulum Arrow, 1915
Anthrenus senegalensis Pic, 1927
Anthrenus shikokensis Ohbayashi, 1985
Anthrenus sichuanicus Háva, 2004
Anthrenus signatus Erichson, 1846
Anthrenus similaris Kadej, Háva & Kalík, 2007
Anthrenus similis Zhantiev, 1976
Anthrenus simonis Reitter, 1881
Anthrenus sinensis Arrow, 1915
Anthrenus smetanai Kadej & Háva, 2011
Anthrenus snizeki Háva, 2004
Anthrenus socotranus Háva, 2017
Anthrenus sogdianus Zhantiev, 1976
Anthrenus solskianus Sokolov, 1974
Anthrenus sophonisba Beal, 1998
Anthrenus sordidulus Reitter, 1889
Anthrenus sparsutus Fairmaire, 1850
Anthrenus splendidus Háva, 2004
Anthrenus stelma Kadej & Háva, 2006
Anthrenus strakai Herrmann & Háva, 2012
Anthrenus subclaviger Reitter, 1881
Anthrenus subsetosus Arrow, 1915
Anthrenus svatopluki Kadej & Háva, 2013
Anthrenus sveci Háva, 2004
Anthrenus tadzhicus Mroczkowski, 1961
Anthrenus taiwanicus Kadej, Háva & Kitano, 2016
Anthrenus talassicus Sokolov, 1980
Anthrenus tanakai Ohbayashi, 1985
Anthrenus taricus Zhantiev, 2006
Anthrenus tarnawskii Kadej & Háva, 2006
Anthrenus thoracicus Melsheimer, 1844
Anthrenus transcaspicus Mroczkowski, 1960
Anthrenus tryznai Háva, 2001
Anthrenus turnai Háva, 2004
Anthrenus tuvensis Zhantiev, 1976
Anthrenus umbellatarum Chobaut, 1898
Anthrenus umbra Beal, 1998
Anthrenus undatus Reitter, 1881
Anthrenus ussuricus Zhantiev, 1988
Anthrenus verbasci (Linnaeus, 1767)
Anthrenus versicolor Reitter, 1887
Anthrenus vijaii Veer, 2011
Anthrenus viktorai Háva, 2016
Anthrenus vladimiri Menier & Villemant, 1993
Anthrenus warchalowskii Kadej, Háva & Kalík, 2007
Anthrenus wittmeri Mroczkowski, 1980
Anthrenus x-signum Reitter, 1881
Anthrenus zagrosensis Háva, 2004
Anthrenus zahradniki Háva, 2003
Anthrenus zebra Reitter, 1889
Anthrenus zeravshanicus Sokolov, 1979
Anthrenus zhantievi Háva & Kadej, 2006

References

External links

 Anthrenus flavipes, furniture carpet beetle 
 Anthrenus scrophulariae, common carpet beetle

 
Dermestidae genera